Park Yong-wook (born 6 December 1983) is a former South Korean professional StarCraft player who played under the alias Kingdom. He has since retired to become a commentator.

Kingdom, nicknamed "Devil Toss," was one of the world's best Protoss versus Protoss players and is known for his technical unit control. He won a single Ongamenet Starleague (OSL). He fell out of the top 20 players in 2006, and retired with an arm injury. He was briefly a coach of the SK Telecom T1 team but has since left to become a commentator.

Tournament results
 1st — 2003 MyCube OnGameNet Starleague

See also
 StarCraft professional competition

References

Living people
South Korean esports players
StarCraft players
Sportspeople from South Gyeongsang Province
T1 (esports) players
South Korean Buddhists
1983 births
StarCraft coaches
StarCraft commentators